Amor is a 1940  Argentine comedy film directed and written by Luis Bayón Herrera and starring Severo Fernández.

Cast
Salvador Arcella
Severo Fernández
Regina Laval
Aída Luz
Mirtha Montchel
Pepita Muñoz
Ernesto Raquén
Pepita Serrador
Adolfo Stray
Iris Tortorelli

References

External links
 

1940 films
1940 romantic comedy films
Argentine black-and-white films
Films directed by Luis Bayón Herrera
1940s Spanish-language films
Argentine romantic comedy films
1940s Argentine films